A Hall effect sensor (or simply Hall sensor) is a type of sensor which detects the presence and magnitude of a magnetic field using the Hall effect. The output voltage of a Hall sensor is directly proportional to the strength of the field. It is named for the American physicist Edwin Hall.

Hall sensors are used for proximity sensing, positioning, speed detection, and current sensing applications. Frequently, a Hall sensor is combined with threshold detection to act as a binary switch. Commonly seen in industrial applications such as the pictured pneumatic cylinder, they are also used in consumer equipment; for example, some computer printers use them to detect missing paper and open covers. Some 3D printers use them to measure filament thickness.

Hall sensors are commonly used to time the speed of wheels and shafts, such as for internal combustion engine ignition timing, tachometers and anti-lock braking systems. They are used in brushless DC electric motors to detect the position of the permanent magnet. In the pictured wheel with two equally spaced magnets, the voltage from the sensor peaks twice for each revolution. This arrangement is commonly used to regulate the speed of disk drives.

Working principle
In a Hall sensor, a current is applied to a thin strip of metal. In the presence of a magnetic field perpendicular to the direction of the current, the charge carriers are deflected by the Lorentz force, producing a difference in electric potential (voltage) between the two sides of the strip.  This voltage difference (the Hall voltage) is proportional to the strength of the magnetic field.

Hall effect sensors respond to static (non-changing) magnetic fields. This is a key difference from inductive sensors, which respond only to changes in fields.

Hall probe
A Hall probe is a device that uses a calibrated Hall effect sensor to directly measure the strength of a magnetic field.  Since magnetic fields have a direction as well as a magnitude, the results from a Hall probe are dependent on the orientation, as well as the position, of the probe.

Materials 
The key factor determining sensitivity of Hall effect sensors is high electron mobility. As a result, the following materials are especially suitable for Hall effect sensors:

 gallium arsenide (GaAs),
 indium arsenide (InAs),
 indium phosphide (InP),
 indium antimonide (InSb),
 graphene.

Signal processing and interface
Hall sensors are linear transducers. Such sensors require a linear circuit for processing the sensor output signal. This circuit provides the drive voltage for the sensor and is used to amplify the output signal. In some cases, the linear circuit may cancel the offset voltage of Hall sensors. Moreover, AC modulation of the driving current may also reduce the influence of this offset voltage.

Hall sensors with linear transducers are commonly integrated with digital electronics. This enables advanced corrections to the sensor characteristics (e.g. temperature-coefficient corrections) and digital interfacing to microprocessor systems. In some IC Hall sensors a DSP is integrated, which can allow more processing techniques directly within the sensor package. The Hall sensor interfaces may include input diagnostics, fault protection for transient conditions, and short/open-circuit detection. It may also provide and monitor the current to the Hall sensor itself. There are precision IC products available to handle these features. Some microcontrollers such as the ESP32 integrate a Hall sensor, which can be read by the microcontroller's internal analog-to-digital converter.

Advantages and disadvantages 

Hall sensors are capable of measuring a wide range of magnetic fields, and are sensitive to both the magnitude and orientation of the field.  When used as electronic switches, they are less prone to mechanical failure, since there is no wear on physical parts. They can also be operated at higher frequencies than mechanical switches.

Hall effect switches cannot be used in areas with high external magnetic fields. Hall sensors can be prone to thermal drift due to changes in environmental conditions, and to time drift over the lifetime of the sensor.

Applications

Position sensing 
One of the most common industrial applications of Hall sensors used as binary switches is in position sensing. Hall sensors are also used in brushless DC motors to sense the position of the rotor and to switch the transistors in the right sequence. Another example of a Hall effect position sensor is the sensor used to detect whether a smartphone's cover is closed. See Galaxy S4 accessories.

Direct-current (DC) transformers 
Hall sensors may be utilized for contactless measurements of direct current in current transformers. In such a case the Hall sensor is mounted in a gap in the magnetic core around the current conductor. As a result, the DC magnetic flux can be measured, and the DC current in the conductor can be calculated.

Automotive fuel-level indicator 
Hall sensors are used in some automotive fuel-level indicators. The sensor is used to detect the position of a floating element within the fuel tank.

Keyboard switch 
Hall effect switches for computer keyboards were developed in the late 1960s by Everett A. Vorthmann and Joseph T. Maupin at Honeywell. Due to high manufacturing costs these keyboards were often reserved for high-reliability applications such as aerospace and military. As mass-production costs have declined, an increasing number of consumer models have become available.

See also
Reed switch

References

Further reading

External links

Magnetic devices
Position sensors
Transducers